Rajalingam Gunaratnam (born 14 December 1941) is a Malaysian sprinter. He competed in the men's 200 metres at the 1968 Summer Olympics.

References

1941 births
Living people
Athletes (track and field) at the 1968 Summer Olympics
Malaysian male sprinters
Olympic athletes of Malaysia
Place of birth missing (living people)
Asian Games medalists in athletics (track and field)
Asian Games gold medalists for Malaysia
Athletes (track and field) at the 1966 Asian Games
Medalists at the 1966 Asian Games
Southeast Asian Games gold medalists for Malaysia
Southeast Asian Games medalists in athletics